Amelia is a female given name. It is an English-language variant of Amalia, derived from the Hebrew word amal meaning 'work', and connoting industriousness and fertility. Diminutive forms include Amy, Emma, Milly and Mel. The name also exists in Spanish and other languages, such as Romanian.

Etymologists believe that the name Amelia is unrelated to the Latin nomen , from which originates the English birth name Emily.

Popularity
In 2013 it was the eighth most popular name for girls in Australia.

Notable people
Amalberga of Maubeuge (died 690), Saint Amelia, early medieval saint
Princess Amelia of Great Britain (1711–1786)
Princess Amelia of the United Kingdom (1783–1810)
 Amelia Beauclerc (1790–1820), British Gothic novelist
 Amelia Adamo (born 1947), Swedish magazine founder and editor
Amelia Andersdotter (born 1987), Swedish politician
 Amelia Edith Huddleston Barr (1831–1911), English novelist
Amelia Bloomer (1818–1894), American feminist, started the newspaper The Lily, popularized bloomers
Amelia Bullmore (born 1964), English actress
Amelia R. Coats (1877–1967), American printmaker
Amelia Crowley (fl. 1995-), Irish actress
Amelia Dimoldenberg (born 1994), English journalist and comedian
Minnie Driver (born Amelia Fiona J. Driver, 1970), English actress
Amelia Earhart (1897–1937), American aviator and feminist
 Amelia Robles Ávila, known as Amelio Robles Ávila, colonel during the Mexican Revolution
Amelia Rose Earhart (born 1983), American pilot and news anchor 
Amelia Elizabeth Roe Gordon (1852-1932), British-born Canadian social reformer
Amelia Heinle Luckinbill (born 1973), American actress
Amelia Kemp, English footballer
Amelia Lily (born 1994), English singer
Amelia Okoli (1941–2017), Nigerian high jumper
Amelia Perrier (1841–1875), Irish novelist and travel writer
Amelia Boynton Robinson (1911–2015), American activist and civil rights leader
Amelia M. Starkweather (1840–1926), American educator and author
Amelia Vega (born 1984), Miss Universe 2003, from the Dominican Republic
Amelia Warner (born 1982), English actress
Amelia B. Coppuck Welby (1819–1852), American poet 	
Lady Amelia Windsor (born 1995), English model

Fictional characters 
Title character in Henry Fielding's novel Amelia (novel)
Title character in Amelia's notebooks, a series of books by Marissa Moss
Naughty Amelia Jane, doll antiheroine of a children's book series by Enid Blyton
Amelia (Underworld), the only female Vampire Elder in the Underworld film series
Amelia Bedelia, title character in books by Peggy Parish
Amelia Bones in the Harry Potter series
Amelia Bonetti, character portrayed by Giulietta Masina in the 1986 film Ginger and Fred by Federico Fellini
Amelia Brand in the 2014 film Interstellar, played by Anne Hathaway
Amelia Gabble, an English goose in the 1970 animated film The Aristocats
Amelia Louise McBride, title character in the graphic novel series Amelia Rules! by Jimmy Gownley
Amelia "Milly" Michaelson, a character in 1986 American fantasy drama film The Boy Who Could Fly
Amelia Murgatroyd (nicknamed Amy), minor character in the 1950 novel A Murder Is Announced by Agatha Christie  
Amelia Peabody, the main character in a series of mystery novels by Elizabeth Peters
Amelia Pond, usually called Amy Pond, companion of the Eleventh Doctor in the television series Doctor Who
Amélie Poulain from Jean-Pierre Jeunet's French comedy film Amélie
Amelia Sachs in  the Lincoln Rhyme Series, written by Jeffrey Deaver, played by Angelina Jolie in the movie version of The Bone Collector
Amelia Sedley in Vanity Fair (novel) by William Thackeray
Amelia Wil Tesla Seyruun in anime Slayers
Amelia Shepherd, a neurosurgeon in the popular TV medical dramas Grey's Anatomy and Private Practice 
 Princess Amelia Thermopolis, commonly called "Mia", main character in The Princess Diaries book series by Meg Cabot
Amelia Voght, a Marvel Comics character in the X-Men franchise
Amelia Von Butch, a treasure hunter and main antagonist in the 2005 animated film Scooby-Doo! in Where's My Mummy?
Amelia in the TV series Rubbadubbers
Amelia Hughes, the first season antagonist of the 2019 animated series Infinity Train
Captain Amelia in the 2002 film Treasure Planet

See also
Amelia (disambiguation)
 Amélie (given name)
 Amalie (given name)

References

English feminine given names
German feminine given names
Italian feminine given names
Czech feminine given names
Slovak feminine given names
Scandinavian feminine given names